The 1974 Ballon d'Or,  given to the best football player in Europe as judged by a panel of sports journalists from UEFA member countries, was awarded to the Dutch striker Johan Cruyff on 31 December 1974. There were 26 voters, from Austria, Belgium, Bulgaria, Czechoslovakia, Denmark, East Germany, England, Finland, France, Greece, Hungary, Italy, Luxembourg, the Netherlands, Norway, Poland, Portugal, Republic of Ireland, Romania, Soviet Union, Spain, Sweden, Switzerland, Turkey, West Germany and Yugoslavia. Cruyff became the first footballer to earn the award three times, following up from his wins in 1971 and 1973. French playmaker Michel Platini and Dutch compatriot Marco van Basten also won the Ballon d'Or three times after him.

Rankings

References

External links
 France Football Official Ballon d'Or page

1974
1974–75 in European football